Live is a Danish television singing competition created by the Danish Broadcasting Corporation. The show was created as a successor to X Factor, following Danmarks Radio's decision to cancel the program. The show was picked up by TV 2 in 2019, and the show has been broadcast from there since then.

Live, much like other singing competitions, offers a prize to the winner of the show to help boost their career. Currently, the winner of the competition receives 250,000 Danish krones.

Overview  
The show begins with short clips of three songs being played. The audience votes on the two best songs. Once the votes are cast, the judges decide who they want on their team to perform the songs. If the judges choose the same person, the viewers decide which judge gets which candidate. After the fourth episode, the judges were made to choose two candidates from each category: male singers, female singers, and the band who will go through to the main live shows.

At home, viewers rate the performers on a scale of 1 to 10. The show's DJ, Pelle Peter Jensen, acts as the representative voice of the viewers; he casts the votes for the viewers. The person who receives the most votes proceeds to the next stage, while the two with the fewest votes are sent to an elimination round where a judge must decide who will stay and who will be sent home.

References 

Danish television series
DR TV original programming